Stella Madden is an English actress who played Sue Brannigan in ITV soap opera Emmerdale. She has had several other one-off appearances in other British shows, such as Casualty and Holby City.

External links

Year of birth missing (living people)
Living people
English television actresses
Place of birth missing (living people)
21st-century English actresses